Damiano Borean (born 12 January 1997) is an Italian rugby union player. His usual position is as a Prop and he currently plays for Petrarca Padova in Top12.

For 2019–20 Pro14 season, he named like Additional Player for Benetton.

After playing for Italy Under 20 in 2016, in 2018 and 2021 Borean was named in the Emerging Italy squad for the World Rugby Nations Cup and for 2021 end-of-year rugby union internationals. On the 14 October 2021, he was selected by Alessandro Troncon to be part of an Italy A 28-man squad for the 2021 end-of-year rugby union internationals.

References

External links 
It's Rugby France Profile
Eurosport Profile

1997 births
Living people
Benetton Rugby players
Italian rugby union players
Petrarca Rugby players
Rugby union props